The Convention on the Unification of Certain Points of Substantive Law on Patents for Invention, also called Strasbourg Convention or Strasbourg Patent Convention, is a multilateral treaty signed by Member States of the Council of Europe on November 27, 1963 in Strasbourg, France. It entered into force on August 1, 1980 and led to a significant harmonization of patent laws across European countries.

This Convention establishes patentability criteria, i.e. specifies on which grounds inventions can be rejected as not patentable. Its intent was to harmonize substantive patent law but not procedural law. This Convention is quite different from the European Patent Convention (EPC), which establishes an independent system for granting European patents.

The Strasbourg Convention has had a significant impact on the EPC, on national patent laws across Europe, on the Patent Cooperation Treaty (PCT), on the Patent Law Treaty (PLT) and on the WTO's TRIPS.

Ratifications and accessions 
Thirteen countries ratified the treaty or acceded to it: Belgium, Denmark, France, Germany, Ireland, Italy, Liechtenstein, Luxembourg, the Republic of Macedonia, Netherlands, Sweden, Switzerland, and United Kingdom.

Further reading 
 Christopher Wadlow, Strasbourg, the Forgotten Patent Convention, and the Origins of the European Patents Jurisdiction, IIC, 2010, Vol. 2, p. 123ff.

See also 
 Community patent
 International Patent Institute (IIB)
 List of Council of Europe treaties
 Paris Convention for the Protection of Industrial Property
 Substantive Patent Law Treaty (SPLT)

External links 
Official text of the Convention
Dates of signatures, ratifications, accessions and entry into force
Declarations and reservations

European patent law
Treaties concluded in 1963
Treaties entered into force in 1980
Patent law treaties
Council of Europe treaties
Treaties of Belgium
Treaties of Denmark
Treaties of France
Treaties of West Germany
Treaties of Ireland
Treaties of Italy
Treaties of Liechtenstein
Treaties of Luxembourg
Treaties of North Macedonia
Treaties of the Netherlands
Treaties of Sweden
Treaties of Switzerland
Treaties of the United Kingdom
1963 in France
Treaties extended to the Netherlands Antilles
Treaties extended to Aruba
Treaties extended to Greenland
Treaties extended to the Faroe Islands
Treaties extended to Clipperton Island
Treaties extended to French Guiana
Treaties extended to French Polynesia
Treaties extended to the French Southern and Antarctic Lands
Treaties extended to Guadeloupe
Treaties extended to Martinique
Treaties extended to Mayotte
Treaties extended to New Caledonia
Treaties extended to Réunion
Treaties extended to Saint Pierre and Miquelon
Treaties extended to Wallis and Futuna